Arithang Assembly constituency is one of the 32 assembly constituencies of Sikkim, a north east state of India. This constituency falls under Sikkim Lok Sabha constituency.

Members of Legislative Assembly
 2009: Narendra Kumar Pradhan, Sikkim Democratic Front
 2014: Shyam Pradhan, Sikkim Krantikari Morcha

Election results

2019

See also

 Sikkim Lok Sabha constituency
 East Sikkim district

References

Assembly constituencies of Sikkim
Gangtok district